VOTA is the second self-titled album (though the first by this name) by the Christian rock band VOTA, formerly known as Casting Pearls. The album was released as a digital download on November 11, 2008, and released as a physical CD on February 10, 2009. The band is able to give $40.00 USD to Food for the Hungry through a matching grant with US AID for every album sold from their online store and merchandise table on tour. Since the digital release of the album in November, the band has helped raise over $200,000 for the Food for the Hungry project in Kenya (as of July 2009).

Track listing
All tracks written by Bryan Olesen/Case Maranville/Scott Rutz except where noted.
 "Hard to Believe" – 2:56
 "Be Mine" – 2:56
 "Love's Taken Over" – 3:13
 "Honestly" Jason Ingram/Doug McKelvey/Bryan Olesen – 3:10
 "Not Finished" – 3:06
 "I'll Go" – 3:28
 "Give It to Me" – 3:00
 "Free to Fail" – 4:04
 "Save Ourselves" Nathan Dantzler/Brad Irby – 3:51
 "Bye Bye" – 3:35
 "In My Heart" – 4:33
"Everyday Is the First Day" (Bonus Track) – 4:02
"Our Time Now" (Bonus Track) – 3:56
"Alright" (Bonus Track) from the Casting Pearls release
"Weighted" (Bonus Track) from the Casting Pearls release
"You Alone" (Bonus Track) from the Casting Pearls release

Personnel
Bryan Olesen – lead vocals, guitar
Case Maranville – bass guitar, background vocals
Scott Rutz – drums, percussion, background vocals

Additional personnel
Phil Joel – background vocals
Anthony Porcheddu – keyboards
Chris Carmichael – string arrangements and performances (violin, viola and cello)
Jim Cooper – piano, background vocals
Nathan Dantzler – digital editing, programming, piano, percussion, keyboards, background vocals, additional guitars
Gang Vocals: Riley Friesen, Brandon Spinazzola, Nathan Dantzler, Brad Irby and Paige Dantzler

Charted singles
"Hard to Believe" #17 (May 2, 2009)

References

2008 albums
2009 albums
VOTA albums
INO Records albums